Denis Geppert (born 24 January 1976) is a German luger who competed between 1996 and 2006. He earned two silver medals at the 2002 FIL European Luge Championships in Altenberg, Germany in the men's singles and mixed team events.

Geppert also finished seventh in the men's singles event at the 2002 Winter Olympics in Salt Lake City.

References

 FIL-Luge profile

External links
 
 

1976 births
Living people
German male lugers
Olympic lugers of Germany
Lugers at the 2002 Winter Olympics